and  (born February 23, 1986) are Japanese identical twin sister actresses. They were born in Osaka, Osaka. Mana is the older one, born 7 minutes before Kana.

History
They debuted at the age of 5, appearing in television commercials.
In 1996, they appeared in the Asadora Futarikko, playing the main twin characters as children.
In March 2008, both graduated from Kwansei Gakuin University.
In 2008, they starred in the Asadora Dandan about twins separated in infancy. Mana played a Shimane Prefecture school girl who loves to play in a rock band. Kana played a maiko from Kyoto Prefecture.

Discography

ManaKana
 (1997.03.20)
 (1997.08.21)
 (1998.07.01)
 (1998.07.01)
 (1998.07.18)

(2007.01.31)
Fighting Girl (2007.09.19)
 (2008.01.30)

External links
Official website 
ManaKana on Universal Music Group Japan 
Official blog: Mana Kana no Smile Blog 

1986 births
Japanese television actresses
Identical twin actresses
Asadora lead actors
Living people
Japanese twins
People from Osaka
Universal Music Japan artists